Emma Keane may refer to:

 Emma Keane (Ackley Bridge), fictional character from the British school drama
 Emma Keane (The Bill), fictional character from the British police procedural television series